idobi Radio is one of the USA’s top modern rock Internet radio stations focusing on new pop punk and alternative music. The station broadcasts over the Internet via its website, app, and iTunes. Established in 1999, idobi features interviews and music coverage, and radio shows hosted by popular artists. The stream plays a mix of established alternative artists and new unsigned acts, most notably having featured artists like Good Charlotte, Fall Out Boy, and Simple Plan prior to the bands' mainstream successes.

As of January 2016, the station has roughly 5.5 million unique listens per month. idobi Radio used to be the #1 alternative rock stream and the #1 alternative radio station on SHOUTcast.com at the time when it broadcast there.

History 
idobi Radio was established in February, 1999 in Washington, DC by then MTV Networks producer Tom Cheney. The station broadcast through the Live365 radio platform in two formats: Alternative Rock and Top 40, which initially ran off Cheney's home computer. The station became more popular by promoting itself through concert tours, especially the Vans Warped Tour, and by teaming up with popular artists.

The introduction of the iTunes Internet radio directory boosted listenership even further. idobi dropped the Top 40 stream in early 2003 in order to focus on the Alternative Rock stream and to launch a new website covering music news, album reviews, concert photos, and artist information. In 2003, the Live365 platform was also dropped in favor of SHOUTcast.

In 2014, idobi Radio was awarded "Best Single Stream Webcaster" at the 5th Annual RAIN internet Radio Awards at RAIN Summit Indianapolis.

Since 2014, idobi has partnered with Warped Tour to create iWR – idobi Warped Radio – the official internet radio station for the festival. iWR features interviews, takeovers, and spotlights on Vans Warped Tour artists running for the duration of the summer festival's dates.

idobi participated in the 2015 setting of CRB rates for internet radio by the U.S. Copyright office. Arguments were presented that the previous royalty rates were too high, and have prevented competition in the internet radio space.

Currently, the station garners in excess of 5 million listeners a month, according to Triton Digital. The accompanying website is a multimedia platform consisting of music news, album reviews, concert photos, artist features and interviews, and in-studio performance videos. idobi is owned by Joel Madden of Good Charlotte, Sébastien Lefebvre and Chuck Comeau of Simple Plan, along with founder Tom Cheney, and Eddie Barella.

idobi music 
idobi and its shows have played a role in breaking out bands like Good Charlotte, Simple Plan, Fall Out Boy, and many others. The station's playlist rotation is based on top alternative hits with an emphasis on new music and deep album cuts from top alternative artists.

idobi Radio also has two sister stations: Howl, launched in 2013 with a focus on metal and hardcore music; and Anthm, which plays indie rock and indie pop.

Shows 
Artists Arguing – Mondays at 6pm hosted by Eden xo.
Awsten + Travis’ Slumber Party – Weekly podcast co-hosted by Waterparks vocalist and rhythm guitarist Awsten Knight, and Travis Riddle, focused on reading and reviewing Waterparks fan fiction. Episodes air every Monday at 7pm ET.
Babes Behind the Beats with Jess Bowen & Bowie Jane – one of the top rating radio shows, Wednesdays at 7pm ET hosted by Jess Bowen (from the Summer Set) and DJ Bowie Jane (Paul Oakenfold, Toolroom Records) - Jess and Bowie interview females working in the music industry whether it be onstage or behind the scenes including music managers, artists, sound engineers, publicists, photographers, drummers, keyboardists and more. Guests include Cassadee Pope, Eva Gardner (Pink), LP Giobbi, Stella Bossi, Patty Anne Miller (Beyonce), Amanda Davis (Janelle Monae), Mandy Lee (Mister Wives), Valerie Morehouse (5 Seconds of Summer) and so many more.
BLACKOUT – Late night talk show focusing on areas of the paranormal, conspiracy theories, metaphysical, true crime and other fringe topics. Featuring interviews with expert in those fields as well as interviews with rock bands and alternative models. Hosted by rock singer Samantha Scarlette; the show is a spin off of the 20 minute paranormal segment Scarlette previously did for The Eddie Jason & Chris Show. Airs Fridays at 11pm ET.
The Brett Davern Show – Morning talk show hosted by actor Brett Davern, and actress Katie Leclerc. Featuring interviews with artists, actors, and entertainers, along with music, and listener interaction; airs weekdays at 10am ET. Video versions of each episode are posted on YouTube with closed captioning.
Dangerous Darrin Show – Talk show featuring interviews with artists, hosted by Goldfinger drummer and record producer Darrin Pfeiffer, and TS; airing Tuesdays at 7pm ET.
Geek Girl Riot – All things geeky hosted by a collective of diverse women, created by idobi Creative Director and producer Sherin Nicole. Discusses hot topics and events in pop culture, special features, interviews and conversations with authors, artists, filmmakers, actors, and creatives. Airs Tuesdays at 11pm ET.
Gone Fishkin – Hosted by Mike "Fish" Fishkin, Gone Fishkin is a live talk show with a focus on new music and interviews with both rising and established artists and entertainers; airing Thursdays at 9pm ET.
The Gunz Show – A music-focused show featuring artist interviews, news, requests, and listener interaction hosted by Mike "Gunz" Gunzelman, broadcast live from Madison Square Garden in New York, NY, on Wednesdays at 9pm ET, and Sundays at 9pm ET.
idobi Warped Radio (formerly Warped idobi Radio) – Stylized as iWR, idobi Radio is partnered with Vans Warped Tour to bring listeners an insider Warped Tour experience, featuring interviews with the bands on the lineup, spotlights on the non-profit charities on the tour, and takeovers from artists. Airs during the full run of the Vans Warped Tour each year.
In Frequency – Music-focused talk show featuring interviews with artists, hosted by Eleanor Grace; airing Sundays at 7pm ET.
Let's Talk Music – Hosted by Sara "Scoggs" Scoggins, Let's Talk Music is an interactive hour of listening and talking about music powered by listener requests and broadcast live from Los Angeles on Tuesdays at 9pm ET.
Man of the Hour – Hot talk hosted by Simple Plan guitarist Sébastien Lefebvre and Canadian television personality, iHeartRadio Canada, and Énergie 94.3 host Patrick Langlois. The show was picked up by Virgin Radio Montreal 96 on March 21, 2010. The show returned to idobi Radio December 1, 2010. Airs Wednesdays at 8pm ET.
Metal DNA – Weekly music show showcasing one metal and hardcore act each week, hosted by Shawn Kupfer; airing Saturdays at 8pm ET on idobi Howl.
The Mike Herrera Hour – Hosted by Mike Herrera from MxPx, The Mike Herrera Hour is a talk show featuring guests, ranging from musicians to political news editors, for philosophical conversation about music, touring, religion, politics, and self-help; airing Fridays at 8pm ET.
The Nick Major Show – Thursdays at 10pm ET
The Noise – Debuted in 2015 on Dash Radio, The Noise's online radio show broadcasts on idobi Radio. Hosted by Jimmy Smith, with a focus on alt-rock and heavy metal music; airing Saturdays at 7pm ET.
Peer Pleasure – Hosted by Dewey Halpaus; airs Saturdays at 6pm ET.
Spinning Thoughts – Hosted by Angelo Gargaro; airs Thursdays at 12am ET.
Rock The Walls – Music radio, interviews, and talk hosted by Patrick Walford from Toronto, Canada; airing Thursdays at 8pm ET on idobi Howl, Saturdays at 8pm ET on idobi Radio.
Tosta Mista – Music radio with a focus on showcasing artists from Portugal, hosted by Álvaro Costa; airing Wednesdays at 7am ET on idobi Anthm.
The Undiscovered Sound – Hosted by Jeff Motekaitis; airs Wednesdays at 6pm ET.
Waldman’s Words – Former touring musician turned artist manager Scott Waldman hosts, with a focus on providing advice to up and coming artists, artist managers, and music industry professionals; airing Tuesdays at 8pm ET.

All shows are uncensored and oftentimes controversial.

Past shows 

 ALTop 20 Countdown – The Top 20 Alternative songs of the week are counted down; aired Sundays at 5pm ET from 2008–2011.
Bitch Slap Radio – Comedy and hot talk hosted by Zac Rich from LoonaticTV.com; the show aired Mondays at 10:30pm ET.
Beebs’ Fun Time Radio Show – Music and talk show hosted by Michelle Beebs of Beebs and Her Money Makers; aired Thursdays at 8pm ET in 2015.
Crash Test Radio – Hot talk hosted by Rocco Burro, Houston Calls bassist Jarrett Seltzer, and Jon Sekunda, with Houston Calls singer Tom "The Intern" Keiger. The show aired from 2006–2009.
DJ Rossstar's Punk Rock Show – DJ Rossstar's Punk Rock Show was picked up from American University's WVAU after host, Ross Senack, graduated in 2004. The show ran on idobi Radio from 2004 to 2008, logging 450 shows. Fans were able to interact directly with band members in real time through both instant messenger and telephone. The slot is currently taken over by The Gunz Show.
Eddie Jason & Chris (also called EJC Show) – Weekly live radio show and podcast delivering current events, hot topics, and interviews with musicians, actors, comedians, and newsmakers. Hosted by Eddie Barella, Jason Newcomer, and Chris Barr; airing Mondays at 8pm ET. From October 2016 until April 2017, the show featured a 30-minute paranormal segment with rock singer Samantha Scarlette as the shows "paranormal correspondent". The EJC Show was named Best Podcast in Denver in 2015 and 2016 by Westword. After 15 years on air, the Eddie Jason & Chris Show  aired it last episode on November 20, 2017.
Emo Nite – Hosted by Emo Nite LA founders Morgan Freed, T.J. Petracca, and Barbara Szabo weekly at 10pm ET every Tuesday, including a live broadcast of the Emo Night LA event at 1pm PT on the first Tuesday of the month.
First Person with Josh Madden – Music and talk radio show hosted by Josh Madden; aired Thursdays at 8pm ET from 2010–2013.
Full Frontal – Hosted by Alex Gaskarth and Jack Barakat from All Time Low; the show aired  on idobi Radio Mondays at 7pm ET from 2013–2014.
Godsquad Radio – Syndicated by idobi Radio in 2006.
Gumshoe Radio – Music radio hosted by singer Anthony Raneri and bassist Nick Ghanbarian from Wind-up Records' punk band, Bayside; aired Fridays at 7pm ET.
The Jonathan London Show – Hosted by music video and film director, Jonathan London. The show aired 2006–2007.
Man Overboard Radio – Talk and music show hosted by Man Overboard; aired Mondays at 7pm ET.
Metalix – Beginning as an overnight metal show on Denver FM radio, picked up by idobi Howl. Hosted by Brad "B-Lo" Lopez; airing Monday at 9pm ET.
No Rules Radio – Talk and music show hosted by Allan Lake and Fat Steve from Great Britain and Brooklyn respectively; aired Fridays at 6pm ET.
No Filter – The Weekend Riot's Johnny Costa and Bruce Wiegner host an hour of guests, music, and talk; airing Thursdays at 8pm ET.
Rockin' That with Nick Scalise – Music radio and hot talk hosted by Nick Scalise, Chicago-based music producer and drummer for Mathletes and October Fall; the show aired Tuesdays at 8pm ET.
S&M Radio – Hot talk hosted by actor Sam E. Goldberg and Michelle Nicole; the show aired Tuesdays at 10:30pm ET.
The Sound Lab – Broadcasting from the UK, host Jim Garrett brings weekly interviews with musicians, music concert coverage, and plays new music from new and established artists; airing Sunday 7pm ET on idobi Anthm.
The XtremeBitz Radio Show – idobi Radio's first weekly live show, first airing in 2003. Comedy and hot talk hosted by Eddie Barella, Rob Lego, and featured cast members Jason Newcomer and Chris Barr. The show aired Fridays and Saturdays at 10pm ET. In 2011, a spin-off show was created called Eddie Jason & Chris, which currently airs on idobi Radio.

Incidents 
On March 12, 2014, idobi broke the news that New Found Glory's guitarist, Steve Klein, was charged with multiple counts of lewd conduct with a minor. The story was picked up by Billboard, MTV, The Huffington Post, and Alternative Press.

Other media 
idobi ran a concert photography site called Photos From the Show and an online music video stream called idobiTV, up until 2013. Their concert photography and video content is now featured on the idobi website.

On April 15, 2011, the site released the idobi App, an iOS app for the iPhone, iPod Touch and iPad. On August 30, it was released for Android.

References

External links 
 Official website
 Photos From the Show
 idobiTV

American music websites
Internet radio stations in the United States